Kenneth T. Derr is a member of the board of directors of the Halliburton Company. He is a retired chairman of the board, Chevron Corporation (international oil company). He served as Chevron's Chairman and chief executive officer from January 1, 1989, to December 31, 1999, when he was succeeded by David J. O'Reilly. Derr is also a former chairman of the board of Calpine Corporation, a director of Citigroup Inc., and a former director of Potlatch Corporation. He is a member of the Council on Foreign Relations.

Derr attended Cornell University and was a member of the Sphinx Head Society and the Sigma Phi Epsilon fraternity.

Derr had served as the vice chairman starting in 1985, where he was responsible for the firm's domestic operations. He had earlier spent a year and a half charged with responsibility for implementing the merger of Chevron and Gulf Oil after the firm purchased Gulf in 1984. In August 1988, Chevron named Derr as chairman to succeed George M. Keller, who would be reaching the mandatory retirement age of 65. Keller was to leave office as of January 1, 1989.

References

Cornell University alumni
Chevron Corporation people
Living people
Directors of Chevron Corporation
Year of birth missing (living people)